Andreas Nova Widianto (born 10 October 1977) is an Indonesian former badminton player, and now works as a badminton coach. After ended his duty as an Indonesian mixed doubles national coach, he moved to Malaysia joining the Badminton Association of Malaysia national coach, and officially carry out his duties on 1 January 2023.

Career 
Nova Widianto is considered one of the greatest doubles player in his era. He is known for his superb movement on court and versatility to be paired with various players. Widianto specialized in mixed doubles. He enjoyed some international success with Vita Marissa, winning the Southeast Asian Games in 2001, the Asian Badminton Championships in 2003, and the Japan Open in 2004. However, his greatest success came from a partnership with Lilyana Natsir. They have been one of the world's two or three leading teams. In 2005, they were able to win the World Championships in 2005, beating Xie Zhongbo and Zhang Yawen in the final. The pair once more captured the gold medal at the 2007, by beating Zheng Bo and Gao Ling. They claimed the silver medals at the 2008 Olympic Games, having a shocking loss to the world number 10, Lee Yong Dae and Lee Hyo-jung. At the 2009 BWF World Championships, they also earned the silver medal, losing to the Danish pair. He was the runner up three times in a row, from 2006 to 2008, at the Japan open. They have been runner up at the All England Championships twice, and probably the narrowest one was at 2010, beaten by future Olympic champion, Zhang Nan and Zhao Yunlei, 18-21 25-23 18-21 in an hour and 31 minutes, considered one of the best mixed doubles game that ever played.  Widianto has represented Indonesia in the Sudirman Cup (combined men's and women's world team championships) five times: 2001, 2003, 2005, 2007 and 2009.

2004 Summer Olympics 
He competed in badminton at the 2004 Summer Olympics at the Goudi Olympic Hall, Athens, Greece, in the mixed doubles with partner Vita Marissa and only reached the quarterfinal, after being defeated in the quarterfinal by the Danish pair.

2008 Summer Olympics 
He competed in badminton at the 2008 Summer Olympics as the 1st seed in the mixed doubles with partner Lilyana Natsir and reached the final by beating He Hanbin and Yu Yang in the semifinal with thrilling scores, 15–21 21–11 23–21. In the final, they were defeated by gold medalists, Lee Yong-dae and Lee Hyo-jung of South Korea in straight sets, 21–11 and 21–17.

Personal life 
When he was young, he joined the Tangkas Jakarta badminton club. The parent's names are Santoso (father) and Sutari (mother). His hobby is football. Normally, people called him Nova or Kedheng. He's married former Indonesian national player Eny Widiowati.

Men's doubles 
He also followed some tournaments in men's doubles. He played with Candra Wijaya for a few months, preparing for Thomas Cup event and succeeded to be the runner up of Asian Badminton Championships, lost to Jung Jae Sung and Lee Yong-dae in the final, 21–16 21–18. He also helped Indonesia to claim gold medal in men's team in Southeast Asian Games, partnering with Muhammad Ahsan and beat Mohd Zakry Abdul Latif and Mohd Fairuzizuan Mohd Tazari, 21–18 21–17 to give 3–1 win against Malaysia .

Playing style 
His powerful smash and accurate placement on the court have been a crucial part of Nova's game to dominate the mixed doubles and being at the top level. His mental strength and great spirit also become the decisive factor to win the game and somehow manage to be the other source of his power. The other thing is his ability to keep retrieving the shuttle with such tricky technique also able to make his opponent goes into the trouble.

Achievements

Olympic Games 
Mixed doubles

BWF World Championships 
Mixed doubles

World Cup 
Mixed doubles

Asian Games 
Mixed doubles

Asian Championships 
Men's doubles

Mixed doubles

Southeast Asian Games 
Mixed doubles

BWF Superseries (5 titles, 9 runners-up) 
The BWF Superseries, which was launched on 14 December 2006 and implemented in 2007, was a series of elite badminton tournaments, sanctioned by the Badminton World Federation (BWF). BWF Superseries levels were Superseries and Superseries Premier. A season of Superseries consisted of twelve tournaments around the world that had been introduced since 2011. Successful players were invited to the Superseries Finals, which were held at the end of each year.

Mixed doubles

  BWF Superseries Finals tournament
  BWF Superseries Premier tournament
  BWF Superseries tournament

BWF/IBF Grand Prix (7 titles, 11 runners-up) 
The BWF Grand Prix had two levels, the Grand Prix and Grand Prix Gold. It was a series of badminton tournaments sanctioned by the Badminton World Federation (BWF) and played between 2007 and 2017. The World Badminton Grand Prix was sanctioned by the International Badminton Federation from 1983 to 2006.

Mixed doubles

  BWF Grand Prix Gold tournament
  BWF & IBF Grand Prix tournament

IBF International (1 title, 1 runner-up)
Men's doubles

Mixed doubles

Performance timeline

Indonesian team 
 Senior level

Individual competitions 
 Senior level

References

External links 
 
 
 
 

1977 births
Living people
People from Klaten Regency
Sportspeople from Central Java
Indonesian male badminton players
Badminton players at the 2004 Summer Olympics
Badminton players at the 2008 Summer Olympics
Olympic badminton players of Indonesia
Olympic silver medalists for Indonesia
Olympic medalists in badminton
Medalists at the 2008 Summer Olympics
Badminton players at the 2002 Asian Games
Badminton players at the 2006 Asian Games
Asian Games silver medalists for Indonesia
Asian Games bronze medalists for Indonesia
Asian Games medalists in badminton
Medalists at the 2002 Asian Games
Medalists at the 2006 Asian Games
Competitors at the 2001 Southeast Asian Games
Competitors at the 2005 Southeast Asian Games
Competitors at the 2007 Southeast Asian Games
Competitors at the 2009 Southeast Asian Games
Southeast Asian Games gold medalists for Indonesia
Southeast Asian Games silver medalists for Indonesia
Southeast Asian Games bronze medalists for Indonesia
Southeast Asian Games medalists in badminton
World No. 1 badminton players
Badminton coaches
21st-century Indonesian people
20th-century Indonesian people
Indonesian expatriate sportspeople in Malaysia